Matuguinao, officially the Municipality of Matuguinao, is a 5th class municipality in the province of Samar, Philippines. According to the 2020 census, it has a population of 7,364 people.

Matuguinao were named as a municipal district of Gandara in the year 1948 to 1960 and were converted into a municipality in 1965.

Etymology

Matuguinao or Matugnaw is a Waray-Waray word that literally means cold.

Geography

Baraŋgays

Matuguinao is politically subdivided into 20 barangays.

Climate

Demographics

Economy

Infrastructure
Water and sanitation Water is abundant here in this town, it has cold and hot water source.

Solid Waste Management Garbage are being collected here manually by a karitilya, it is dumped on its garbage dumpsite right side along provincial road going to Matuguinao and after Barruz.

References

External links
 Matuguinao Profile at PhilAtlas.com
 [ Philippine Standard Geographic Code]
 Philippine Census Information
 Local Governance Performance Management System

Municipalities of Samar (province)